Juan Pablo Orlandi (born 20 June 1983) is an Argentine former rugby union footballer who played at prop.

He previously played for Racing Métro in France and Rovigo in Italy. Orlandi has also represented the Argentina national rugby union team. In February 2013, he signed for Bath Rugby for the 2013-14 season. However, on 5 January 2015, Orlandi signed with Newcastle Falcons with immediate effect from the 2014-15 season.
On 6 Jan 2016 he was signed as a Medical Joker replacement to Pau in France. 

He retired in the Aviron Bayonnais in 2019 to start a career as a rugby coach. He coached the Aviron Bayonnais sub-21 team for two years. He signed as a forwards coach in Stade Olympique Chambérien Rugby.

Orlandi made his international debut for Argentina on 8 November 2008 in a test match against France.

Orlandi was called up for Argentina's squad for the 2015 Rugby World Cup.

References

External links

1983 births
Living people
Argentine people of Italian descent
Sportspeople from Mendoza, Argentina
Rugby union props
Rugby Rovigo Delta players
Racing 92 players
Argentine rugby union players
Argentina international rugby union players
Bath Rugby players